The Montreal AAA Winged Wheelers were a Canadian football team and a member of the Interprovincial Rugby Football Union, a league that preceded the Canadian Football League. The team existed from 1872 to 1935. The Montreal AAA sponsored the Montreal Football Club, founded April 8, 1872. The Montreal Football Club joined the Quebec Rugby Football Union in 1883 and used the AAA grounds to play its games. The AAA Winged Wheelers started in the IRFU in 1919.

The team won the 1931 Grey Cup championship.

Team facts 
Founded: 1919

Home stadium: Montreal AAA Grounds

IRFU regular season championships: 3 — 1919, 1931, 1933

IRFU championships: 2 — 1919, 1931

Grey Cup championships: 1 — 1931

Canadian Football Hall of Famers
 Cap Fear
 Billy Hughes
 Frank McGill
 Percival Molson
 Gordon Perry
 Jeff Russel
 Huck Welch

Seasons

References

Interprovincial Rugby Football Union teams
AAA
Defunct Canadian football teams